Smithlea is a rural locality in the Goondiwindi Region, Queensland, Australia.

History 
The Mundoey railway station was on the Texas railway line.

References 

Goondiwindi Region
Localities in Queensland